Ida Adamoff (:  – 5 June 1993) was a French tennis player active in the 1930s.

Adamoff reached the doubles final at the 1935 French Championships with Hilde Krahwinkel Sperling but were defeated in the final by Margaret Scriven and Kay Stammers in two straight sets. Her best singles performance at a Grand Slam tournament was reaching the third round at the French Championships, in 1929, 1931, 1932 and 1935, and at the Wimbledon Championships in 1934. In 1931 she reached the quarterfinals of the mixed doubles event at Wimbledon with Enrique Maier.

In 1930 Adamoff won the singles title at the Championships of Spain and successfully defended her title in 1931. She defeated Cilly Aussem and Lucia Valerio at the Lenz Cup in Merano, Italy in October. In June 1931 she won the singles event at the Berlin Championships followed up in July with a victory at the Dutch Championships in Noordwijk where she beat Toni Schomburgk in the final. In 1932 she added the Romanian and Italian Championships singles titles to her resume. In July 1933 Adamoff won the doubles title at the Dutch Championships with Mrs. Burke.

In 1930 she was ranked no. 2 in France behind Simonne Mathieu.

She married Claude Bourdet in 1935 and had two sons and a daughter.

Grand Slam finals

Doubles
Runners-up (1)

References

French female tennis players
1910 births
1993 deaths
Tennis players from Moscow
Emigrants from the Russian Empire to France
20th-century French women